St. Marks Powder is a subsidiary of General Dynamics Ordnance and Tactical Systems manufacturing ball propellant in Crawfordville, Florida. The company is a member of the Sporting Arms and Ammunition Manufacturers' Institute (SAAMI).

History
Large-scale ball propellant manufacture began during World War II at the Olin Corporation plant in East Alton, Illinois. Population growth of the St. Louis, Missouri, metropolitan area encouraged finding a more remote location for a modern production plant. The St. Marks manufacturing facility was built in 1969 on a large plot of undeveloped swampland south of Tallahassee, Florida, at near sea-level elevation between the St. Marks River and the Gulf Coast. Plant operation was transferred to St. Marks Powder in 1998.

Products
The facility manufactures over 95 percent of propellants used in United States military small arms ammunition. Similar propellants are sold to commercial manufacturers of rimfire and centerfire ammunition or marketed by Winchester and Hodgdon Powder Company for civilian handloading. Other propellants are used for military mortar rounds, rocket-assisted projectiles, or dispersing non-lethal agents used for crowd control, marking, or area denial.

Sources

Ammunition manufacturers
Companies established in 1998
General Dynamics
Wakulla County, Florida
Companies based in Florida